Paul Soniat is the Director of the New Orleans City Park Botanical Gardens.  He was born at the old Touro Hospital in New Orleans. His family has been in New Orleans since 1727 and he grew up and later lived on the street bearing his family name.  Paul is a self-taught piano player, and has released two CDs, absorbing the sights, sounds, and flavor of New Orleans.  His first CD, titled Born in New Orleans, was released in April 2005. His second CD was released after  Hurricane Katrina hit the Gulf coast and the New Orleans' levees failed.  This second CD is appropriately titled Below the Water Line.

External links
 http://neworleanscitypark.com/

People from New Orleans
Living people
Year of birth missing (living people)